Advisory may refer to:

 Advisory board, a body that provides advice to the management of a corporation, organization, or foundation
 Boil-water advisory, a public health directive given by government to consumers when a community's drinking water could be contaminated by pathogens
 Homeroom, or advisory, is the classroom session in which a teacher records attendance and makes announcements
 Significant weather advisory, a Special Weather Statement advising inclement weather is likely or imminent

See also
 Advice (disambiguation)
 Advisory Council (disambiguation)